Antoine Gomis (born 2 April 1989 in Paris, France) is a French basketball player who played for French Pro A league club Le Mans.

References

French men's basketball players
1989 births
Basketball players from Paris
Living people
Nanterre 92 players
21st-century French people